Clavatula coronata is a species of sea snails, a marine gastropod mollusc in the family Clavatulidae.

Distribution
This species occurs in the Atlantic Ocean off Benin and Togo.

References

 

coronata
Gastropods described in 1801